Chen Xiaojia (born 20 October 1991) is a retired Chinese badminton player from Xiangtan, Hunan. She was selected to join the national second team in 2008. Chen was the gold medalist at the 2009 Asian Junior Championships and the bronze medalist at the World Junior Championships, She represented China at the 2009 East Asian Games, and claimed the gold medal in the women's team event, and a bronze medal in the women's singles. Chen clinched the women's singles title at the 2011 Indonesia Open Grand Prix Gold after beat the Frech veteran Pi Hongyan in rubber game.

Achievements

Asian Championships 
Women's singles

East Asian Games 
Women's singles

BWF World Junior Championships 
Girls' singles

Asian Junior Championships 
Girls' singles

BWF Grand Prix 
The BWF Grand Prix has two levels, the BWF Grand Prix and Grand Prix Gold. It is a series of badminton tournaments sanctioned by the Badminton World Federation (BWF) since 2007.

Women's singles

  BWF Grand Prix Gold tournament
  BWF Grand Prix tournament

References

External links 
 
 

1991 births
Living people
People from Xiangtan
Badminton players from Hunan
Chinese female badminton players
21st-century Chinese women